is a Japanese trumpeter, composer and arranger.

In 1974 Ohno accepted Art Blakey's offer and went to the U.S. He made recordings in cooperation with famous musicians, and some of his songs sold very well. He played active parts as a member of MACHITÖ Y SUS AFROCUBANAS and became known in Europe and South America. In 1984, he won a Grammy Award for his album Machito and His Salsa Big Band. Four years later, he also won for Live at Sweet Basil. Ohno was involved in a traffic accident in 1988 which made him stop playing the trumpet, but he later recovered. In 2014, he became the first Japanese jazz player to win the Grand Prize of the International Songwriting Competition, for his song "Musashi".

Biography
Ohno Shunzo was born in Gifu Prefecture in 1949.

He started enjoying music when he was 13. When he was 17, he was absorbed in the jazz music, playing in Clubs and Nightclubs featuring big bands After one year, he came out as a professional jazz trumpeter. By the time he was 20, he became one of the top jazz trumpeter in Japan. In 1974, he met jazz drum master and Band Leader, Art Blakey. He invited Shunzo to join him in New York City. Upon arriving in NYC, he began to tour with Art Blakey and The Jazz Messengers, Roy Haynes, Norman Connors, and later with Wayne Shorter, Larry Coryell, Buster Williams and performances with Herbie Hancock. (shunzoohno.com, Shunzo Ohno Official Site) (NYnoissennde24nen zyazuman Ohno Shunzo, ganwokoete, 1998) Afterwards, he succeeded in playing with Blakey, and, as a member of Dance of Magic, You are my Starship which Norman Connors represent, he participated in the world tour for three years. Also, as a member of Machito and his AfroCuban Orchestra, he participated in all American tours or South American tours. In those days, many drugs were in fashion and Ohno was also addicted to drugs. He wasted almost all of his pay on drugs. However, thanks to his wife's help, he got over this problem.

In 1984, he got Grammy Award for the album Machito and His Salsa Big Band, which included many of his dazzling solos

From 1983, he participated in Gil Evans Orchestra and in 1988, he got Grammy award again for the album Live at Sweet Basil.

On the Christmas Eve in 1988, he got seriously injured in the traffic accident. Fortunately, he came around, but he thought he could not play the trumpet because his mouth and teeth were severely damaged, essential for playing trumpet. However, he did not give up playing, endured his rigorous rehabilitation, and started his professional activity again.

In 1996, a tragedy happened to him again. 4th stage aggressive cancer was found in his tonsils. He could not avoid a major operation removing over 125 muscles and tendons in his neck, followed by 38 rounds of radiation. However, he decided to continue being a professional jazz trumpeter at last. Three months after, Wayne Shorter, who Ono Shunzo respected, requested him to join him in California performances. His offer helped Ohno try to play the trumpet again. He succeeded on the stage. It was his family and Shorter that knew he endured the serious pain. He said "Indeed I lost some time because of two accidents but from these accidents, I learned a lot about how to play the trumpet or to express my own feeling."

In 1999, Ohno participated in Larry Coryell's world tour.

After the major earthquake in the Tohoku District on March 11, 2011, Ohno played many charity performances in many places both in Japan and in foreign countries to support the victims.

In 2014, Ohno got the Grand Prize (International Songwriters Competition) for his song "Musashi" in the International Songwriting Competition, which is famous as one of the best composition competition in the world.

Awards 
1984 Grammy Award for Machito and His Salsa Big Band.
1988 Grammy Award for Live at Sweet Basil.
2001 Music section of Asian-American Jazz Connection from U.J.C. (Universal Jazz Coalition & New York Jazz Center) prize.
2005 Gifu furusato bunka prize (Gifu back home culture prize).
2014 Grand Prize at the International Songwriting Competition (ISC). He was the first Japanese man to get the prize, and the first in the field of jazz.

Source:

Compositions 
Among his best-known compositions are:

Babbles
Something Coming
Machito and His Salsa Big Band
Live at sweet Basil
Sakura(Cherry Blossoms)
Home
Tsuki no Hikari (The Moonlight)

Source:

References

External links
 
 

1949 births
Japanese jazz trumpeters
Living people
21st-century trumpeters
The Eleventh House members